Goalkeeper is a playing position in many team sports which involve scoring goals.

Goalkeeper or goalkeepers may also refer to:

Specific sports
 Goalkeeper (association football)
 Goalkeeper glove
 Goalkeepers coach
 Goalkeeper (bandy)
 Floorball#Goalkeepers
 Handball goalkeeper
 Goalkeeper (field hockey)
 Goaltender, ice hockey
 Save (goaltender)
Goalkeeper (Gaelic games), covering Gaelic football, hurling and camogie
 Goalkeeper (water polo)
Goaltender (field lacrosse), in the men's outdoor sport
Goaltender (women's lacrosse), in the women's outdoor sport
Goaltender (box lacrosse), in the indoor sport
Goalkeeper (netball)

Other uses
 Goalkeeper CIWS, a Dutch close-in naval weapon system
 Goalkeepers (Gates Foundation), an initiative to bring together leaders from around the world to accelerate progress toward achieving the Sustainable Development Goals
 The Goalkeeper (1936 film), Soviet film
 The Goalkeeper (2000 film), Spanish film
 The Goalkeeper (2018 film), Bolivian film
 The Goalkeeper (video game), see List of Macintosh games

See also
 Crab Goalkeeper, a 2006 Japanese film
 Goalie (disambiguation)
 Goalkeeper of the Galaxy or Cosmoball, a 2020 Russian film
 Goaltender mask, in various sports
 The Goalkeeper's Fear of the Penalty, a 1972 German film
 Theodore the Goalkeeper, a 1950 Austrian-German film